John Krop Lonyang'apuo (born 10 December 1964) is a Kenyan politician. He was the former Permanent Secretary for Ministry of Industrialization (2008–2010), under the Leadership of President Mwai Kibaki. He is an active member and party leader of Kenya Union Party at the National Level. He is currently serving as the Governor for West Pokot County after serving as the Senator from 2013 to 2017.He was the governor of West Pokot County from 2017 to 2022.

Life and career

Lonyang'apuo was born in Kanyarkwat, West Pokot County, Kenya. He attended St Mary's School Yala, Nyanza for his secondary education after which he completed his undergraduate studies at Egerton University Kenya where he obtained Bachelor of Science in Pure Mathematics and later on did his graduate studies at the University of Leeds, UK where he obtained his PhD in Applied Mathematics.

He was a member of the Kenyan Senate representing West Pokot County from March 4, 2013 to August 8, 2017 having been elected on a KANU Party ticket.

In April 2019, Lonyangapuo became a social media and news sensation across Kenya after a video of him attacking a Mr. Ruto Kapchok surfaced online. The video which was later widely shared across social media platforms shows an irritated and irate Lonyangapuo addressing his constituents in Makutano, Kapenguria, the capital of West Pokot County where he humorously referred to Mr. Kapchok as "Kijana Fupi Round". The saga brought the otherwise moderately known governor to the limelight with his "kijana Fupi" utterances quickly becoming a national talking point which even drew remarks from both the President and his Deputy.

References

http://www.pulselive.co.ke/bio/west-pokot-county-prof-john-lonyangapuo-profile-id7002402.html
https://softkenya.com/kenya/john-krop-lonyangapuo/
https://kenyanlife.com/john-krop-lonyangapuo-west-pokot-county-governor-2017-2022/

Living people
County Governors of Kenya
Members of the Senate of Kenya
Kenya African National Union
Government of Kenya
Egerton University alumni
Alumni of the University of Leeds
1964 births